Premium Plaza is a class A office building located in the city of Bucharest, Romania. The building was opened in 2007. It stands at a height of 64 meters and has 15 floors, with a net area of 8,645 m2. It is also equipped with 50 underground parking spaces.

Notes

Skyscraper office buildings in Bucharest
Office buildings completed in 2007
2007 establishments in Romania